Burleson High School is a four-year public high school consisting of grades 9–12 located in Burleson, in the U.S. state of Texas, and is part of the Burleson Independent School District.

History
In 1901, Burleson's first school, the Red Oak Academy, was constructed. In 1909, the building was destroyed by fire. The State of Texas granted a charter for an independent school district, and the citizens of Burleson voted to construct a new school.  By 1910 the new school was opened, on what is now the old Nola Dunn Campus. The school was later torn down and a new high school was constructed in the 1960s. In 1997, a new, larger campus was built for the high school. It was built at 100 John Jones Road, but the street name later changed to Elk Drive.

Notable alumni
Kyle Burns – drummer, Forever the Sickest Kids
Kelly Clarkson – Grammy Award winning singer, songwriter, American Idol season 1 winner, and daytime talk show host
Jonathan Cook – singer, Forever the Sickest Kids
Liz Lee – protagonist of the quasi-reality MTV show My Life as Liz
Stacy Sykora – three-time Olympian volleyball player (2000, 2004, 2008)

References

Schools in Johnson County, Texas
Burleson Independent School District high schools